St. Mary of the Assumption Church is a historic church on 501 W. Magnolia Avenue in Fort Worth, Texas.  The structure was designed by the firm Sanguinet, Staats and Hedrick.  The first mass was held on July 20, 1924.  
The church was added to the National Register on May 10, 1984.

See also

National Register of Historic Places listings in Tarrant County, Texas
Recorded Texas Historic Landmarks in Tarrant County

References

External links

Roman Catholic churches completed in 1923
Roman Catholic churches in Fort Worth, Texas
Roman Catholic churches in Texas
Churches on the National Register of Historic Places in Texas
National Register of Historic Places in Fort Worth, Texas
Recorded Texas Historic Landmarks
20th-century Roman Catholic church buildings in the United States